Mineola High School may refer to:
Mineola High School (New York)
Mineola High School (Texas)